Nathaniel Arcand (born November 13, 1971) is a Canadian actor. He is known for his first major role in the Canadian drama series North of 60, in which for three seasons he played William MacNeil, smart-mouthed and cocky, a troubled, misunderstood teen. In 1997, he was nominated for a Gemini Award in the category "Best Performance by an Actor in a Featured Supporting Role in a Dramatic Series" for the North of 60 episode "Traces and Tracks."

Life and career
He was raised in Edmonton, Alberta. He is Nēhilawē (Plains Cree), from the Alexander First Nation Reserve. Essential supports throughout his life are Nathaniel's mother and his great grandparents. Nathaniel has one daughter, Trisha O'Chiese, and two sons, Jaden Plaizier and Griffin Powell-Arcand. Griffin is also an actor.

Arcand's most recent role is Clinton Skye in FBI: Most Wanted, an American TV Series on CBS. One of Arcand's longest running roles is that of Scott Cardinal on the CBC series Heartland. Also in television, Nathaniel portrays Victor Merasty on Blackstone, "an unmuted exploration of First Nations’ power and politics" set in a small Plains Cree community. In one of his latest film roles, Arcand portrays Nathan in the comedic drama Two Indians Talking, which won the 2010 Vancouver International Film Festival Most Popular Canadian Film Award.

Filmography

Films

Television

Awards and recognition
Best Supporting Actor, American Indian Film Festival 2005 for Johnny Tootall
Performing Arts Award, Aboriginal Role Models of Alberta 2006
Best Actor Nomination, Winnipeg Aboriginal Film Festival 2010 for Two Indians Talking
Best Actor Nomination, American Indian Motion Picture 2010 for Two Indians Talking

Trivia
Nathaniel Arcand is a lead character in both the film Two Indians Talking by director Sara McIntyre and in the television series Blackstone.  In both the film and the television series, he shares the screen with two of the same actors: Carmen Moore and Justin Rain.

References

External links
 Kiss Dust Pictures
 Blackstone Official Website
 Nathaniel Arcand's profile at Northernstars.ca
 Arcand's profile in Native Threads
 Article about Arcand in I Heart Edmonton blog
 Nathaniel Arcand Official Fansite 1
 Nathaniel Arcand Official Fansite 2
 Nathaniel Arcand on IMDB

Canadian male film actors
Canadian male television actors
First Nations male actors
Cree people
Living people
1971 births
Male actors from Edmonton